San Juan Quiahije Chatino Sign Language is an emerging village sign language of the indigenous Chatino villages of San Juan Quiahije and Cieneguilla in Oaxaca, Mexico, used by both the deaf and some of the hearing population. It is apparently unrelated to Mexican Sign Language. As of 2014, there is a National Science Foundation-funded study and also a National Institutes of Health-funded study of the development of this language.

Non-signing hearing people in the village use various gestures for negation when speaking, and these are retained in Chatino Sign Language.  The variability of these signs may be due to the small size of the deaf population in comparison to the number of hearing people who use them as co-speech gestures.

References

External links 
 ELAR archive of Investigating an undocumented sign language in a Chatino speech/sign community

Village sign languages
Sign languages of Mexico
Home sign
Languages attested from the 2010s